Republic Steel is an American steel manufacturer that was once the country's third largest steel producer.  It was founded as the Republic Iron and Steel Company in Youngstown, Ohio in 1899. After rising to prominence during the early 20th Century, Republic suffered heavy economic losses and was eventually bought out before re-emerging in the early 2000s as a subsidiary. The company currently manufactures Special Bar Quality (SBQ) steel bars and employs around 2,000 people. It is currently owned by Grupo Simec, based in Guadalajara, Mexico.

Corporate history

Origins and rise to prominence
In 1927, Cyrus S. Eaton acquired and combined Republic with several other small steel companies, with the goal of becoming large enough to rival U.S. Steel. The newly named Republic Steel Corporation was headquartered in Cleveland, Ohio, and  became America's third largest steel company, trailing only U.S. Steel and Bethlehem Steel after acquiring Bourne-Fuller Company and the Central Alloy Steel Company (located in Massillon, Ohio) in the 1930s.

Tom M. Girdler became the first chairman of the board of directors.  Eaton hired Girdler from Jones and Laughlin Steel Company, where he had served as president. Girdler modernized Republic Steel with the introduction of better alloys such as "light steel". During World War II, while still chairman of Republic Steel, Girdler relocated to California to serve as chief executive officer of Consolidated Aircraft, a military aircraft manufacturer.  Following the war, Girdler left Consolidated to run Republic's aviation department.

Republic Steel was known for its labor problems during the Depression. On Memorial Day, May 26, 1937, a strike escalated into the Memorial Day massacre of 1937, in which Chicago police fired into an unarmed group of protesters, and killed ten, four outright. This was documented by the 1937 short film Republic Steel Strike Riot Newsreel Footage. Girdler never signed the labor contract.

When Girdler retired in 1945, Charles M. White was named chairman of the company.  White was a protégé of Girdler's at Jones & Laughlin Steel, and was appointed assistant vice president in charge of operations at Republic Steel in May 1930. Five years later, when Girdler was appointed president of Republic Steel, White was promoted to take over Girdler's role as vice president of operations. In 1945, White was elected president of Republic Steel by the company's board of directors.  He replaced Rufus Wysor, who retired. In 1960, at the age of 70, Charles M. White retired as chairman of Republic Steel. He remained on the board of directors until 1966, and was given the title of honorary chairman.

Thomas Patton, a private attorney who worked on the merger that formed Republic Steel was hired in 1936 to form Republic's internal legal department.  As general counsel in the 1930s and 1940s, he negotiated with workers on behalf of management during the steel strikes. He went on to become president, then chief executive and chairman.

Innovations
Republic Steel built a steel rolling mill in 1958 in Cotorro, Cuba. Plant manager Ernest Breedlove fled Cuba with his new Cuban bride when Fidel Castro confiscated the plant and shipped the newly installed machinery to the Soviet Union. Breedlove built another modern plant for Compania Fundidora de Fierro y Acero de Monterrey, S. A. in Monterrey Mexico and later pioneered the mini-mill concept at Nucor Steel.

Republic Steel was one of the last major steel firms to use low-phosphorus Adirondack magnetites, operating the Chateaugay Ore & Iron Company in Lyon Mountain, New York from 1939 to 1967.  The Chateaugay mine was one of the deepest commercial iron ore mines in the United States, with stopes as much as 3,500 feet (1,050 m) below the surface.

Decline, merger, and re-launch
Republic Steel remained prosperous until the 1970s, when rising foreign imports, labor costs, and other factors caused severe stress at Republic and throughout the steel industry in the U.S.

In 1984, Republic merged into the Jones and Laughlin Steel subsidiary of the LTV Corporation, with the new entity being known as LTV Steel. An employee stock ownership plan bought LTV's steel bar division and renamed it Republic Engineered Steels in 1989. In 1998, Republic Engineered Steels merged with Bar Technologies to become Republic Technologies International. Republic Engineered Products was established in December 2003 with the purchase of operating assets from Republic Engineered Products LLC. In July 2005 RES was acquired by Industrias CH, S.A de C.V. (ICH). In September 2011 RES changed its name to Republic Steel.

Recent corporate history
In April 2014, the company agreed to pay a $2.4 million fine to the Occupational Safety and Health Administration (OSHA) and agreed to "settle alleged health and safety violations" at four Republic Steel facilities—in Canton, Lorain and Massillon in Ohio, and in Blasdell, New York. OSHA said they found over 100 violations of health and safety at the facilities run by Republic.

See also
Birmingham District
Memorial Day massacre of 1937
Little Steel strike

References

Further reading

External links
Western Reserve Historical Society history
Historic American Engineering Record documentation:

Steel companies of the United States
Manufacturing companies based in Cleveland
Defunct companies based in Cleveland
American companies established in 1899
Manufacturing companies established in 1899
Manufacturing companies disestablished in 1984
Historic American Engineering Record in Ohio
1899 establishments in Ohio
1984 disestablishments in Ohio
2011 establishments in Ohio
Former components of the Dow Jones Industrial Average
Historic American Engineering Record in Alabama